Maria Oyeyinka Laose is the first female Nigerian Ambassador/Permanent Representative  to Austria, Slovakia, UNOV and International Organisations in Vienna. She was appointed in 2011 by H.E President Goodluck Ebele Jonathan and served until mid 2013 upon her retirement from the Nigerian foreign service after 35 meritorious years.
She studied French at the University of Ife and received her BA Honours in 1975.

She is fluent in English, French and Portuguese. She started her career in the foreign service in 1978.

Amb.Laose served in various capacities in the Ministry of Foreign Affairs, among them: Director, UN Division and International Organizations Department (2007-2011); Director, Foreign Service Academy (2006-2007); Minister, Chargé d'Affaires, Nigerian Embassy/Permanent Mission to the United Nations in Vienna, Austria (2002-2006); Deputy Chief of Protocol, assistant director, European Affairs Department (1998-2002); Counselor, Nigerian Permanent Mission to the UN in New York, United States (1992-1998); and First Secretary, Nigerian Embassy in Paris, France (1982-1986).

She rose through the ranks and was appointed Nigerian Ambassador to Austria and Slovakia by H.E President Goodluck Ebele Jonathan in 2011. She is the first female Nigerian Ambassador/ Permanent representative to Austria, Slovakia, UNOV and International Organisations in Vienna.

Her tenure as the Nigerian Ambassador to Austria and Slovakia  saw the first visit of a high-level Austrian official (Vice- Chancellor Michael Spindelegger) to Nigeria after 50 years of diplomatic relations as well as the first Adire festival, and street parade showcasing Nigerian culture held by NANCA with her active collaboration. She also organised the Nigerian Business Forum in Vienna and Bratislava during her tenure  among other notable feats.

She holds the United Nations Disarmament Fellowship Certificate and Portuguese proficiency certificate from ISLA Lisbon.

She has two children.

References

External links 
 https://unis.unvienna.org/unis/en/pressrels/2011/unisbio949.html
 http://nigeriaembassyvienna.com/news/?newsid=111
 http://www.nigeriaembassyvienna.com/news/?newsid=102
 https://www.iaea.org/newscenter/news/encouraging-women-pursue-international-careers

Living people
Ambassadors of Nigeria to Austria
Nigerian women ambassadors
1954 births